Hanover is a very large city in northern Germany.

Hanover may also refer to:

Animals
 Hanover (horse) (1884–1899), American Thoroughbred racehorse

People
 House of Hanover, a German royal dynasty
 Donna Hanover, American journalist
 Karl Hanover

Places

States or regions of Germany
 Hanover Region
 Hanover Fairground, the largest exhibition ground in the world, located in Hanover, Germany
 Hannover Messe, the world's biggest industrial fair held each April on the Hanover Fairground
 Hanover (region)
 Electorate of Hanover, unofficial name of Prince-Electorate of Brunswick-Lüneburg (1692/1708−1814)
 Kingdom of Hanover (1814–66)
 Province of Hanover (1866–1946), Prussian province
 State of Hanover, a post-war German state in the British Zone

Canada
 Rural Municipality of Hanover, Manitoba
Hanover School Division
 Hanover, Ontario

Chile
 Hanover Island, an island in the Patagonic Archipelago

Jamaica
 Hanover Parish

Papua New Guinea
 New Hanover Island, an island in the Bismarck Archipelago

South Africa
 Hanover, Northern Cape

United Kingdom
 Hanover, Brighton, a suburb within the city of Brighton and Hove
 Hanover Street, Liverpool, a street in central Liverpool, part of Liverpool ONE

United States
 Hanover, Connecticut
 Hanover, Illinois
 Hanover, Indiana
 Hanover, Kansas
 Hanover, Maine
 Hanover, Maryland
 Hanover, Massachusetts
 Hanover, Michigan
 Hanover, Minnesota
 Hanover, New Hampshire, a New England town
 Hanover (CDP), New Hampshire, the main village in the town
 Hanover, New Mexico
 Hanover, New York
 Hannover, North Dakota
 Hanover, Ohio
 Hanover, Pennsylvania
 Battle of Hanover
 Hanover, Virginia
 Hanover, Wisconsin
 Hanover County, Virginia
 East Hanover Township, New Jersey
 North Hanover Township, New Jersey

Ships
 Hanover, Falmouth Packet ship wrecked off Cornwall in December 1763
 , a Norddeutscher Lloyd cargo liner captured by the Royal Navy in 1940

Other uses
 Hanover (automobile), a former American automobile manufacturer
 Hanover College
 Hanover Displays, a public transport destination display manufacturer based in the United Kingdom
 Hanover Farm House
 Hanover Finance, a failed financial company that was based in New Zealand
 Hanoverian horse, a German horse breed
 Hanover Insurance, an insurance company based in Worcester, Massachusetts
 Hanover Shoe, American shoe company
 Hanover-Taché Hockey League, a defunct senior ice hockey league in Manitoba, Canada
 Hanover Tache Junior Hockey League, a junior ice hockey league in Manitoba, Canada
 Snyder's of Hanover, a bakery and snack food distribution company based in Hanover, Pennsylvania
 Hanover Lutheran Church, a congregation in Cape Girardeau, Missouri
 Manufacturers Hanover Corporation, a former bank holding company
 Hanover, a musical piece by composer Alvin Lucier

See also
 Hannover (disambiguation)
 Hanover Airport (disambiguation)
 Hanover House (disambiguation)
 Hanover Park (disambiguation)
 Hanover Square (disambiguation)
 Hanover Street (disambiguation)
 Hanover Township (disambiguation)